Autophony is the unusually loud hearing of a person's own voice.

Possible causes are:
 The "occlusion effect", caused by an object, such as an unvented hearing aid or a plug of ear wax, blocking the ear canal and reflecting sound vibration back towards the eardrum.
 Serous otitis media
 Open or patulous Eustachian tube, allowing vocal or breathing sounds to be conducted into the middle ear
 Superior canal dehiscence, which can lead to an abnormally amplified bone conduction of sound into the inner ear. Persons with superior canal dehiscence syndrome (SCDS) typically hear not only their own voice but also heartbeat, footsteps, chewing, intestinal sounds and possibly even the sound of their eye movements when reading.

References

External links 

 
 Definition of Autophony
 Painhealth.com - Definition of Autophony
 emedicine Patulous Eustachian Tube
 SCDS with Autophony
 SCDS with Autophony - animation
 "Doctor, I can hear my eyes" - W Albuquerque, A M Bronstein
 ABC News - Health - The Musician Who Heard Too Much

Symptoms and signs of mental disorders
Hearing
Auditory system